In computing, the BIOS parameter block, often shortened to BPB, is a data structure in the volume boot record (VBR) describing the physical layout of a data storage volume. On partitioned devices, such as hard disks, the BPB describes the volume partition, whereas, on unpartitioned devices, such as floppy disks, it describes the entire medium. A basic BPB can appear and be used on any partition, including floppy disks where its presence is often necessary; however, certain filesystems also make use of it in describing basic filesystem structures. Filesystems making use of a BIOS parameter block include FAT12 (except for in DOS 1.x), FAT16, FAT32, HPFS, and NTFS. Due to different types of fields and the amount of data they contain, the length of the BPB is different for FAT16, FAT32, and NTFS boot sectors. (A detailed discussion of the various FAT BPB versions and their entries can be found in the FAT article.) Combined with the 11-byte data structure at the very start of volume boot records immediately preceding the BPB or EBPB, this is also called FDC descriptor or extended FDC descriptor in ECMA-107 or ISO/IEC 9293 (which describes FAT as for flexible/floppy and optical disk cartridges).

FAT12 / FAT16

DOS 2.0 BPB 

Format of standard DOS 2.0 BPB for FAT12 (13 bytes):

DOS 3.0 BPB 

Format of standard DOS 3.0 BPB for FAT12 and FAT16 (19 bytes), already supported by some versions of MS-DOS 2.11:

DOS 3.2 BPB 

Format of standard DOS 3.2 BPB for FAT12 and FAT16 (21 bytes):

DOS 3.31 BPB 

Format of standard DOS 3.31 BPB for FAT12, FAT16 and FAT16B (25 bytes):

DOS 3.4 EBPB 

Format of PC DOS 3.4 and OS/2 1.0-1.1 Extended BPB for FAT12, FAT16 and FAT16B (32 bytes):

FAT12 / FAT16 / HPFS

DOS 4.0 EBPB 

Format of DOS 4.0 and OS/2 1.2 Extended BPB for FAT12, FAT16, FAT16B and HPFS (51 bytes):

FAT32

DOS 7.1 EBPB 

Format of short DOS 7.1 Extended BIOS Parameter Block (60 bytes) for FAT32:

Format of full DOS 7.1 Extended BIOS Parameter Block (79 bytes) for FAT32:

NTFS 

Format of Extended BPB for NTFS (73 bytes):

exFAT BPB
exFAT does not use a BPB in the classic sense. Nevertheless, the volume boot record in sector 0 is organized similarly to BPBs.

See also
 BPB formats in the FAT file systems
 MDBPB (Microsoft DoubleSpace BPB)

References

Further reading 
  — a description of BPBs, from version 2.0 to version 7.0
  — In the "processing the BIOS parameter block" section the authors describe the evolution of the BIOS parameter block from the MS-DOS version 2.0 BPB to the PC DOS version 4.0 BPB, and label each field with the DOS version that introduced it.
  — Figure 4.3 contains a diagram of the version 4.0 BPB and states that the layout of BPBs "is not defined by Microsoft and can vary with different vendors". At the time that the book was written, this was true. Microsoft first publicly documented the BPB structure in the OS/2 Developers' Toolkit.
  — Verstak reverse engineers the BIOS parameter block. The paper contains several errors. One such is its statement that "the presence of the EBPB in FAT32 is not documented by Microsoft". See:
  — Microsoft documents a version 4.0 BPB and a new "FAT32 BIOS Parameter Block (BPB)" (a version 7.0 BPB) for DOS-Windows 98 that is "larger than a standard BPB", has an "identical structure to a standard BPB", but that also "includes several extra fields".
  — Microsoft documents extended BPBs on both FAT16 and FAT32 volumes. It also documents BPBs on NTFS volumes.
  — The table "BPB and Extended BPB Fields on NTFS Volumes" describes BPBs on NTFS volumes. The descriptions of several fields contradict those given in the Windows 2000 Resource Kit.
  — an issue that affects BPBs
  
  — on the misuse of OEM labels and Microsoft's Volume Tracker
 
 
 
 
 
 

BIOS
DOS technology